Lefty Nelson was an American baseball pitcher in the Negro leagues. He played with the Atlanta Black Crackers in 1937 and the Newark Eagles in 1938.

References

External links
 and Seamheads

Atlanta Black Crackers players
Newark Eagles players
Year of birth missing
Year of death missing
Baseball pitchers